The Somali bunting or Somali golden-breasted bunting (Emberiza poliopleura) is a species of bird in the family Emberizidae.

It is found in Ethiopia, Kenya, Somalia, South Sudan, Tanzania, and Uganda. Its natural habitats are dry savannah and subtropical or tropical dry shrubland.

References

Somali bunting
Birds of the Horn of Africa
Somali bunting
Taxonomy articles created by Polbot